This is a list of 156 species in Aleochara, a genus of rove beetles in the family Staphylinidae.

Aleochara species

 Aleochara albopila (Mulsant & Rey, 1852) g
 Aleochara albovillosa Bernhauer, 1901 200 u
 Aleochara algarum Fauvel, 1862 u
 Aleochara angusticeps Sharp, 1883 i c g
 Aleochara antennalis Fenyes, 1914 g
 Aleochara arizonica Klimaszewski, 1984 i c g
 Aleochara ashei Maus, 2000 i c g
 Aleochara asiatica Kraatz, 1859 g
 Aleochara assiniboin Klimaszewski, 1985 g
 Aleochara aterrima Gravenhorst, 1802 g
 Aleochara atra Gravenhorst, 1806 g
 Aleochara baranowskii Klimaszewski and Génier, 1987 i c g
 Aleochara beckeri Klimaszewski in Klimaszewski, Frank and Peck, 1990 i c g
 Aleochara bellonata Krása, 1922 g
 Aleochara bilineata Gyllenhal, 1810 i c g
 Aleochara bimaculata Gravenhorst, 1802 i c g
 Aleochara binotata Kraatz, 1856 g u
 Aleochara bipustulata (Linnaeus, 1761) i c g u
 Aleochara bonariensis Lynch, 1884 g
 Aleochara brevipennis Gravenhorst, 1806 g u
 Aleochara brundini Bernhauer, 1936 g
 Aleochara bucharoensis Lohse, 1988 g
 Aleochara carmanah Klimaszewski, 2002 g
 Aleochara castaneipennis Mannerheim, 1843 i c g
 Aleochara cavernicola Klimaszewski, 1984 i c g
 Aleochara cayennensis Laporte de Castelnau, 1835 g
 Aleochara centralis Sharp, 1883 i c g
 Aleochara clavicornis Redtenbacher, 1849 g
 Aleochara coreana Bernhauer, 1926 g
 Aleochara cornuta Fauvel, 1886 g
 Aleochara crassa Baudi di Selve, 1848 g
 Aleochara crassiuscula Sahlberg, C.R., 1831 u
 Aleochara cribrata Fenyes g
 Aleochara cristata Assing, 2009 g
 Aleochara cuniculorum Kraatz, 1858 g u
 Aleochara curtidens Klimaszewski, 1984 i c g
 Aleochara curtula (Goeze, 1777) i c g b u
 Aleochara daviesi Klimaszewski & Brunke, 2012 g
 Aleochara densissima Bernhauer, 1906 i c g
 Aleochara depressa (Sharp, 1883) i c g
 Aleochara dilatata Erichson, 1840 g
 Aleochara discipennis Mulsant & Rey, 1853 g u
 Aleochara diversa (Sahlberg, J., 1876) non Mulsant & Rey, 1853 u
 Aleochara diversicollis Fauvel, 1900 g
 Aleochara eoa  g
 Aleochara erythroptera Gravenhorst, 1806 g
 Aleochara fenyesi Bernhauer, 1905 i c g
 Aleochara formosae Cameron, 1940 g
 Aleochara formosanorum Pace, 1993 g
 Aleochara fucicola Sharp, 1874 g
 Aleochara fumata Gravenhorst, 1802 i c g u
 Aleochara funebris Wollaston, 1864 g u
 Aleochara gaudiuscula Tottenham, 1939 g
 Aleochara gracilicornis Bernhauer, 1901 i c g
 Aleochara granulicauda Cameron, 1935 g
 Aleochara grisea Kraatz, 1856 (Kraatz, 1806) g u
 Aleochara haematoptera Kraatz, 1858 g
 Aleochara haemoptera Kraatz, 1856 g
 Aleochara haworthi Stephens, 1832 g
 Aleochara hayamai Yamamoto & Maruyama g
 Aleochara heeri Likovský, 1982 g
 Aleochara hydrocephala Fauvel, 1900 g
 Aleochara inconspicua Aubé, 1850 g u
 Aleochara inexpectata Klimaszewski g
 Aleochara inexspectata Klimaszewski, 1984 i c g
 Aleochara insularis Fenyes g
 Aleochara intricata Mannerheim, 1830 g u
 Aleochara irmgardis Vogt, 1954 g
 Aleochara kamila Likovský, 1984 g u
 Aleochara lacertina Sharp, 1883 i c g
 Aleochara laevigata Gyllenhal, 1810 g
 Aleochara lanuginosa Gravenhorst, 1802 i c g u
 Aleochara laramiensis (Casey, 1906) i c g
 Aleochara lata Gravenhorst, 1802 i c g b u
 Aleochara laticornis Kraatz, 1856 g
 Aleochara lindbergi Likovský, 1963 g
 Aleochara littoralis (Mäklin, 1853) i c g b
 Aleochara lobata Klimaszewski, 1984 i c g
 Aleochara lucifuga (Casey, 1893) i c g
 Aleochara lustrica Say, 1834 i c g b
 Aleochara lygaea Kraatz, 1862 g u
 Aleochara maculata Brisout de Barneville, 1863 g u
 Aleochara major Fairmaire, 1858 g
 Aleochara marmotae Sainte-Claire Deville, 1927 g
 Aleochara milleri Kraatz, 1862 g
 Aleochara minuta (Casey, 1906) i c g
 Aleochara moerens Gyllenhal, 1827 g u
 Aleochara moesta Gravenhorst, 1802 g u
 Aleochara nidicola Klimaszewski, 1984 i c g
 Aleochara nigra Kraatz, 1859 g
 Aleochara niponensis Sharp, 1888 g
 Aleochara notula Erichson, 1839 i c g
 Aleochara nubis (Assing, 1995) g
 Aleochara obesa Coiffait, 1980 g
 Aleochara obscurella Gravenhorst, 1806 g u
 Aleochara ocularis Klimaszewski, 1984 i c g
 Aleochara opacella (Sharp, 1883) i c g
 Aleochara opacina Fauvel, 1900 g
 Aleochara pacifica (Casey, 1894) i c g b
 Aleochara parens Sharp, 1874 g
 Aleochara pauxilla sensu auctt. non Mulsant & Rey, 1874 u
 Aleochara peeziana Lohse, 1961 g
 Aleochara penicillata Peyerimhoff, 1901 g
 Aleochara peusi Wagner, 1949 g
 Aleochara phycophila Allen, 1937 g u
 Aleochara postica Walker, 1855 g
 Aleochara praesul Sharp, 1874 g
 Aleochara pseudochrysorrhoa Caron, Mise & Klimaszewski, 2008 g
 Aleochara pseudolustrica Klimaszewski in Klimaszewski, Frank and Peck, 1990 i c g
 Aleochara puberula Klug, 1834 i c g
 Aleochara puetzi (Assing, 1995) g
 Aleochara pulchra Gravenhorst, 1806 g
 Aleochara punctatella Motschulsky, 1858 g u
 Aleochara quadrata Sharp, 1883 i c g
 Aleochara rubricalis (Casey, 1911) i c g
 Aleochara rubripennis (Casey, 1906) i c g b
 Aleochara ruficornis Gravenhorst, 1802 g u
 Aleochara rufobrunnea Klimaszewski, 1984 i c g
 Aleochara rufonigra Klimaszewski, 1984 i c g
 Aleochara salina Fauvel, 1885 g
 Aleochara sallaei Sharp, 1883 i c g
 Aleochara salsipotens Bernhauer, 1912 g
 Aleochara sanguinea (Linnaeus, 1758) g u
 Aleochara sculptiventris (Casey, 1893) i c g b
 Aleochara segregata Yamamoto & Maruyama g
 Aleochara sekanai Klimaszewski, 1985 i c g
 Aleochara semirubra Graëlls, 1858 g
 Aleochara sequoia Klimaszewski and Génier, 1987 i c g
 Aleochara shelleyae Klimaszewski & Langor, 2011 g
 Aleochara signaticollis Fairmaire & Germain g
 Aleochara solieri Bernhauer & Scheerpeltz, 1926 g
 Aleochara solskyiana Likovský, 1984 g
 Aleochara spadicea (Erichson, 1837) g u
 Aleochara sparsa Heer, 1839 g u
 Aleochara speculicollis Bernhauer, 1901 i c g
 Aleochara spissicornis Erichson, 1839 g
 Aleochara squalithorax Sharp, 1888 g
 Aleochara stichai Likovský, 1965 g u
 Aleochara suffusa (Casey, 1906) i c g
 Aleochara sulcicollis Mannerheim, 1843 i c g b
 Aleochara taeniata Erichson, 1839 i c g
 Aleochara tahoensis Casey, 1906 i c g
 Aleochara taiwanensis Pace, 2010 g
 Aleochara tenuicornis Kraatz, 1856 g
 Aleochara thoracica Casey, 1906 i c g
 Aleochara tristis Gravenhorst, 1806 i c g u
 Aleochara trisulcata Weise, 1877 g
 Aleochara unicolor Klimaszewski, 1984 i c g
 Aleochara vagepunctata Kraatz, 1856 g
 Aleochara valida LeConte, 1858 i c g
 Aleochara verna Say, 1836 i c g u
 Aleochara villosa Mannerheim, 1830 i c g u
 Aleochara wickhami (Casey, 1906) i c g
 Aleochara yaeyamensis  g
 Aleochara yamato Yamamoto & Maruyama g
 Aleochara zerchei (Assing, 1995) g

Data sources: i = ITIS, c = Catalogue of Life, g = GBIF, b = Bugguide.net, u = Beetles of the British Isles

References

Aleochara